Megachile asuncicola is a species of bee in the family Megachilidae. It was described by Strand in 1910.

References

Asuncicola
Insects described in 1910